The Rive Gauche (Left Bank) is the southern bank of the river Seine in Paris. Here the river flows roughly westward, cutting the city in two parts. When facing downstream, the southern bank is to the left, and the northern bank (or Rive Droite) is to the right.

The Left Bank is associated with artists, writers, and philosophers, including Colette, Margaret Anderson, Djuna Barnes, Natalie Barney, Sylvia Beach, Erik Satie, Kay Boyle, Bryher, Caresse Crosby, Nancy Cunard, Hilda Doolittle (H.D.), Janet Flanner, Jane Heap, Maria Jolas, Mina Loy, Henry Miller, Adrienne Monnier, Anaïs Nin, Jean Rhys, Gertrude Stein, Alice B. Toklas, Renee Vivien, Edith Wharton Pablo Picasso, Arthur Rimbaud, Paul Verlaine, Henri Matisse, Jean-Paul Sartre, Ernest Hemingway, F. Scott Fitzgerald, James Baldwin, and dozens of other members of the great artistic community at Montparnasse.  The phrase implies a sense of bohemianism, counterculture, and creativity.  Some of its famous streets are the boulevard Saint-Germain, the boulevard Saint-Michel, the rue Bonaparte, and the rue de Rennes.

The Latin Quarter is situated on the Left Bank, within the 5th and 6th arrondissements in the vicinity of the University of Paris. In the 12th century, the philosopher Pierre Abélard helped create the neighborhood when, due to his controversial teaching, he was pressured into relocating from the prestigious Île de la Cité to a less conspicuous residence. As he and his followers populated the Left Bank, it became famous for the prevalence of scholarly Latin spoken there. The area's origin story formed the basis of the saying, "Paris 'learned to think' on the Left Bank".

See also 
 Arrondissements of Paris
 Rive Droite (Paris)
 Bank (geography)

References

Further reading 
Baxter, John.  Montparnasse: Paris's District of Memory and Desire (2017)
Benstock, Shari. Women of the Left Bank: Paris, 1900–1940 (1986)
Lottman, Herbert R.  The Left Bank: Writers, Artists, and Politics from the Popular Front to the Cold War (1982)
Muir, Kate.  Left Bank (2006)
Poirier, Agnes.  Left Bank: Art, Passion, and the Rebirth of Paris, 1940–50 (2018)
Webster, Paul. Saint-Germain-des-Pres  (1984)
Weiss, Andrea. Paris Was a Woman: Portraits of the Left Bank'' (2013)

Geography of Paris
Tourist attractions in Paris